ZNF837 is a protein that in humans is encoded by the ZNF837 gene, is located at 19q13.431 with minus strand orientation.  ZNF837 protein is characterized as a C2H2-type zinc finger protein.

Homology and Evolution

The human ZNF837 has homologs present in many mammals and seen more distantly.  All homologs are chordates.  All contain both COG5048 and Zf-C2H2_2 domains.  The areas that these domains are found contain the highest conservation rates.  In humans, 5 Zf-H2C2 double domains and 2 COG5048 domains are present.

The protein sequence is fast evolving among these homologs.  

ZNF837 has numerous paralogs in humans, all of which are zinc finger proteins.

Human ZNF837
In humans, there are no other aliases, and its neighboring genes are MIR4754, A1BG, and RPS5.  ZNF837 mRNA that is made into function protein contains 1921 nucleotides, of which 222-1817 are translated to a protein containing 3 exons.  The protein consists of 531 amino acids with a weight of 58,078 Da  with an isoelectric point at 9.525.

Gene Variants
There are 2 transcript variants.  Transcript variant 1, 2050 base pairs in length, is non-coding due to a nonsense-mediated mRNA decay
.  Transcript variant 2 is made into the functional protein due to an alternate splice site

Post Translational
It is predicted via high conservation to have 4 phosphorylation sites at T386, T455, S460, Y503.  The internal structure is includes combination of alpha helices, beta sheets and mainly random coils.

Expression
ZNF837 has observed in the pancreas, liver, uterus, and muscle cells.  In all cases concentration is low.  
However, the expression of ZNF837 is seen to have the most impact is when looking at normal vs diseased state.  There is a consistent change that is able to be seen.

References 

Human proteins